The Choral Synagogue of Vilnius is the only synagogue in Vilnius that is still in use. The other synagogues were destroyed partly during World War II, when Lithuania was occupied by Nazi Germany, and partly by the Soviet authorities after the war.

The Choral Synagogue of Vilnius was built in 1903.

The synagogue is built in a Romanesque-Moorish style.

It is the only active synagogue that survived both the Holocaust and Soviet rule in this city that once had over 100 synagogues. During the occupation of Lithuania by the Soviet Union the synagogue was nationalised and turned into a metal factory. Resulting from this usage the building suffered considerable damage. It was restored in 2010 and opened again as a synagogue shortly thereafter. International donations and a small community of Jews in Vilnius support the synagogue. The synagogue holds services and is open to visitors.

In 2019, the synagogue along with the Jewish community headquarters was temporarily closed due to threats from right-wing groups. The decision coincided with a rise in antisemitic rhetoric related to public debate about honoring Lithuanian collaborators.

Gallery

See also 
 Zamelis Synagogue
 Great Synagogue of Vilna

References

External links
Lithuanian Jewish community

Ashkenazi Jewish culture in Lithuania
Ashkenazi synagogues
Orthodox Judaism in Lithuania
Orthodox synagogues
Synagogues in Vilnius
Synagogues completed in 1903
Judaism in Vilnius
Romanesque Revival synagogues
Moorish Revival synagogues